Judit Elek (born 10 November 1937) is a Hungarian film director and screenwriter. She directed 16 films between 1962 and 2006. Her film Mária-nap was screened in the Un Certain Regard section at the 1984 Cannes Film Festival.

Filmography

 Vásárcsarnok (1962)
 Találkozás-Apróhirdetés (1963)
 Találkozás (1963)
 Kastélyok lakói (1966)
 Meddig él az ember? I-II (1967)
 Sziget a szárazföldön (aka The Lady from Constantinople) (1969)
 Találkozunk 1972-ben (Sötétben-világosban) (1970)
 Egyszerű történet (1974)
 Istenmezején 1972-73-ban (1975)
 Árvácska (1976, screenwriter)
 Vizsgálat Martinovics Ignác szászvári apát és társainak ügyében (1980)
 Majd holnap (1980)
 Mária-nap (1984)
 Tutajosok (1990)
 Ébredés (1995)
 Mondani a mondhatatlant: Elie Wiesel üzenete (1996)
 A hét nyolcadik napja (2006)
 Retrace (2009–2010)

Controversy
For the purposes of the film Tutajosok (1990) 14 sheep were spread with a flammable substance, and then, at the order of Judit Elek, were burned alive. 69 scientists from the Jagiellonian University demanded that the authorities forbid Judit Elek entry to Poland. Scientists wrote among others: "No director knowing her own worth would debase herself for using so primitive and cruel methods".

References

External links

1937 births
Living people
Hungarian film directors
Hungarian women film directors
20th-century Hungarian screenwriters
Writers from Budapest
21st-century Hungarian writers
21st-century screenwriters
20th-century Hungarian women writers
21st-century Hungarian women writers
Women screenwriters